Ana Teresa Villafañe (born June 5, 1989) is an American actress and singer from Miami, Florida, best known for her portrayal of pop icon Gloria Estefan in the Broadway musical On Your Feet!.

Life and career
She was born on June 5, 1989, in Atlanta, Georgia. She graduated from Loyola Marymount University in Los Angeles, California. She is of Cuban and Salvadoran descent.

Villafañe's film and television credits include: the award-winning Magic City Memoirs (executive producer Andy Garcia) "Los Americans" created by Dennis Leoni ("Resurrection Boulevard") Hiding (Anchor Bay) the Hulu Original Series South Beach set in her native Miami, and the female lead in the superhero feature film Max Steel (Mattel).

In the fall of 2014, Gloria Estefan and Emilio Estefan—alongside the producers and creative team of their biographical musical On Your Feet!—launched an international casting search, dubbed "Reach Gloria" (#ReachGloria) which offered performers around the world a chance to audition for the cast of the musical. Thousands of Broadway hopefuls—from Los Angeles, to Australia, to Colombia, to Singapore—auditioned for roles by submitting videos online, or attending one of two open casting calls held in New York City and the Estefans’ home-city of Miami, Florida. A lifelong fan of Gloria Estefan – who even attended the same Miami high school as the pop star – Villafañe learned of the Miami open casting call and, although she was unable to attend, sent the casting office a video audition.  Within three days, she was called to audition for the show's director, Jerry Mitchell, and the Estefans. On April 13, 2015, Villafañe and Josh Segarra were announced on NBC's "Today Show" as the stars of the Broadway-bound musical.

"I feel a very big responsibility to portray her in a real way", Villafañe said in an exclusive interview with InStyle Magazine. "I don't think you can actually replicate Gloria Estefan—you can only do your best to tell her story and be true to the music. I grew up performing her music at talent shows, "Reach" was the first song i ever sang in public when i was 9 years old. That's what we would jam to on our way to school".

Villafañe made her Broadway debut in the role on October 5, 2015, ahead of the show's official opening night at the Marquis Theatre on November 5, 2015. Both she and the show received rave reviews, and Villafañe was named one of The Hollywood Reporter’s top "Broadway Breakout Stars of the Year" She won a Theatre World Award and was nominated for the Outer Critics Circle Award, Drama League Award and Astaire Awards.

Villafañe joined multiple Latin artists on Lin-Manuel Miranda's "Almost Like Praying" in 2017. All proceeds from the song went to help Puerto Rico after being devastated by Hurricane Maria.

In June 2021, Villafañe was cast as a lead in the NBC series Night Court, the sequel to the classic sitcom, but she was replaced by India de Beaufort when the pilot was given a series order.

From September 2021 until January 2022, she  starred as Roxie Hart in the reopening of Chicago on Broadway.

Filmography

References

External links
 

1988 births
Living people
American stage actresses
American television actresses
American musical theatre actresses
American people of Salvadoran descent
Actresses from Miami
American people of Cuban descent
Loyola Marymount University alumni
Theatre World Award winners
21st-century American actresses
21st-century American singers
21st-century American women singers
Singers from Florida
Musicians from Miami